James A. Lowell (April 21, 1849 – April 10, 1900) was a merchant and politician in Niagara Falls, Ontario. He was elected by acclamation from the riding of Welland to the House of Commons of Canada in an 1892 by-election as a Liberal and served a single term until his defeat in the 1896 federal election by Conservative William McCleary.

External links
 

1849 births
1900 deaths
Liberal Party of Canada MPs
Members of the House of Commons of Canada from Ontario